{{DISPLAYTITLE:C25H34O3}}
The molecular formula C25H34O3 (molar mass: 382.544 g/mol) may refer to:

 Estradiol hexahydrobenzoate
 Levonorgestrel butanoate
 Trenbolone enanthate

Molecular formulas